Bryan Allan Braman (born May 4, 1987) is a former American football defensive end who played in the National Football League (NFL) for seven seasons with the Houston Texans, Philadelphia Eagles and New Orleans Saints. He was signed by the Houston Texans as an undrafted free agent in 2011. He played college football for West Texas A&M University after transferring from Long Beach City College. Braman played one season at the University of Idaho out of high school before LBCC.

Professional career

Houston Texans
Braman became a fan favorite on the Texans' special teams unit during the 2011 season. In the season finale against the Tennessee Titans, he tackled punt returner Marc Mariani head-to-head without a helmet on. In 2012, he was a Pro Bowl alternate.

He has also blocked multiple punts on special teams, including one for a touchdown against the Indianapolis Colts.

Philadelphia Eagles
On March 12, 2014, Braman signed a two-year, $3.15 million contract with the Philadelphia Eagles.

New Orleans Saints
On August 23, 2017, Braman signed with the New Orleans Saints. He was placed on injured reserve on September 2, 2017. He was released on September 9, 2017.

Philadelphia Eagles (second stint)
On December 12, 2017, Braman was signed by the Eagles. The Eagles reached Super Bowl LII where they defeated the New England Patriots 41–33 with Braman recording one tackle.

References

External links
 Houston Texans bio
 Philadelphia Eagles bio

1987 births
Living people
American football linebackers
Houston Texans players
Idaho Vandals football players
Long Beach City Vikings football players
New Orleans Saints players
Philadelphia Eagles players
Players of American football from Spokane, Washington
West Texas A&M Buffaloes football players